This is a list of Hindustan Aeronautics S.C.'s managers and their records, from 2010, when the first full-time manager was appointed, to the present day.

Statistics
Information correct as of 21 November 2011. Only competitive matches are counted. Wins, losses and draws are results at the final whistle; the results of penalty shoot-outs are not counted.

Hindustan Aeronautics S.C.
Managers